Jan van Heelu (lived 13th century) was a Flemish writer. Between 1288 and 1294, he wrote a chronicle of the Battle of Woeringen of 1288, between Reinoud I of Guelders, and John I, Duke of Brabant. He was part of the Battle of Woeringen.

Biography
Rymkronyk van Jan van Heelu betreffende den slag van Woeringen van het jaer 1288 (ca. 1288–1294)

Sources
 Jan Frans Willems (ed.), Rymkronyk van Jan van Heelu betreffende den slag van Woeringen van het jaer 1288 (1836)
 Jan van Heelu, Rijmkroniek (Dutch)

Van Heelu, Jan